Duncan Hollow is a valley in Oregon County in the U.S. state of Missouri.

Duncan Hollow bears the name of a pioneer citizen named Duncan who is buried in the valley in an unmarked grave.

References

Valleys of Oregon County, Missouri
Valleys of Missouri